Sorokopolye is a rural locality (a settlement) in Andomskoye Rural Settlement, Vytegorsky District, Vologda Oblast, Russia. The population was 7 as of 2002. There are 5 streets.

Geography 
Sorokopolye is located 37 km north of Vytegra (the district's administrative centre) by road. Novaya Selga is the nearest rural locality.

References 

Rural localities in Vytegorsky District